Edward Timothy "Lefty" Taber (January 11, 1900 – November 5, 1983), was a Major League Baseball pitcher who played in  and  with the Philadelphia Phillies. He batted and threw left-handed. Taber had a 0–1 record, with a 10.80 ERA, in 9 games, in his two-year career.

He was born in Rock Island, Illinois, and died in Lincoln, Nebraska.

External links

1900 births
1983 deaths
Major League Baseball pitchers
Baseball players from Illinois
Dubuque Spartans baseball players
Philadelphia Phillies players
Sportspeople from Rock Island, Illinois
Watertown Cubs players